Scott McGregor (born 5 February 1976) is an Australian former professional basketball player.

Born in Newcastle, New South Wales, McGregor attended the Australian Institute of Sport from 1994 to 1995.

He began his NBL career with the Newcastle Falcons, where he won the NBL Rookie of the Year award.  In 1997, McGregor played in the Australian Under 22's team that won a gold medal in the FIBA World Championships in Melbourne.  McGregor was one of many future NBL stars, including Chris Anstey, Sam Mackinnon and Frank Drmic, to suit up in the team.  After the 1997 NBL season, McGregor moved to the Sydney Kings where he would play until 2000, making the switch to Sydney's cross-town rivals. On 5 April 2007, McGregor left the struggling Razorbacks to become the first player signed by the Gold Coast Blaze.

Since leaving the NBL in 2009, he has played in the Waratah League and the Queensland Basketball League. He retired in 2010.

References

External links
Profile at Eurobasket.com
Profile at andthefoul.com

1976 births
Living people
Australian Institute of Sport basketball players
Australian men's basketball players
Forwards (basketball)
Gold Coast Blaze players
Hawke's Bay Hawks players
Newcastle Falcons (basketball) players
Sydney Kings players
Otago Nuggets players
West Sydney Razorbacks players